Michal Důras (born November 22, 1981) is a Czech professional ice hockey forward who currently plays for Étoile Noire de Strasbourg in the Ligue Magnus. He previously played in the Czech Extraliga for HC Plzeň, BK Mladá Boleslav, HC Zlín and Piráti Chomutov.

References

External links

1981 births
Living people
Sportspeople from Jihlava
BK Mladá Boleslav players
Czech ice hockey forwards
Étoile Noire de Strasbourg players
HC Dukla Jihlava players
HC Plzeň players
HC Slovan Ústečtí Lvi players
PSG Berani Zlín players
Piráti Chomutov players
SK Horácká Slavia Třebíč players
Czech expatriate ice hockey people
Czech expatriate sportspeople in France
Expatriate ice hockey players in France